Jermaine "Stretch" Middleton (born January 15, 1984) was an American basketball player for the Harlem Globetrotters.

Biography
The 7'4" Middleton was born in Los Angeles and started playing basketball as a Crenshaw High School junior.  His friend Dorrell Wright convinced him to attend South Kent School for a post-grad year.  Jermaine attended Central Connecticut State University for two years (playing briefly in 2005-06), before transferring to the West Palm Beach, Florida campus of Northwood University (now part of Keiser University) for his final two years. In 2008 Northwood - with Middleton - made the final eight teams of the NAIA National Tournament.

Middleton played for Rochester and St. Joseph of the Premier Basketball League, and then in China.  He began playing for the Globetrotters starting in the 2011-12 season, and continued through the 2014-15 season.

Middleton currently lives in San Antonio.  He is in business with the Australian company SafeLace.

References

1984 births
Living people
Harlem Globetrotters players
South Kent School alumni
Crenshaw High School alumni
Basketball players from Los Angeles
African-American basketball players
Northwood Timberwolves men's basketball players
Central Connecticut Blue Devils men's basketball players
American men's basketball players
Centers (basketball)
21st-century African-American sportspeople
20th-century African-American people